Eomamenchisaurus (meaning "dawn Mamenchisaurus") is a genus of mamenchisaurid sauropod dinosaur from the Middle Jurassic Zhanghe Formation of Yuanmou, Yunnan, China. The type species is E. yuanmouensis, described by Lü Junchang et al. in 2008.

References

Mamenchisaurids
Middle Jurassic dinosaurs of Asia
Fossil taxa described in 2008
Paleontology in Yunnan
Taxa named by Lü Junchang